Hypostomus strigaticeps is a species of catfish in the family Loricariidae. It is native to South America, where it occurs in the Tietê River basin in Brazil. The species reaches 16 cm (6.3 inches) in standard length and is believed to be a facultative air-breather. It feeds primarily on algae, with the diet of individuals in polluted habitats differing from that of those in more preserved ones.

References 

strigaticeps
Fish described in 1908
Catfish of South America
Fish of South America
Fish of Brazil